Kamala Markandaya (23 June 1924 – 16 May 2004), pseudonym of Kamala Purnaiya, married name Kamala Taylor, was a British Indian novelist and journalist. She has been called "one of the most important Indian novelists writing in English".

Life

Early life
Markandaya was born into an upper-middle-class Deshastha Madhva Brahmin family. A native of Mysore, India, Markandaya was a graduate of Madras University, and afterwards published several short stories in Indian newspapers. After India declared its independence, Markandaya moved to Britain, though she still labelled herself an Indian expatriate long afterwards. Kamala was a descendant of diwan Purnaiya and was fluent in Kannada and Marathi.

Career
She was well-known for writing about culture clash between Indian urban and rural societies, Markandaya's first published novel, Nectar in a Sieve (1954), was a bestseller and cited as an American Library Association Notable Book in 1955. Her other novels include Some Inner Fury (1955), A Silence of Desire (1960), Possession (1963), A Handful of Rice (1966), The Coffer Dams (1969), The Nowhere Man (1972), Two Virgins (1973), The Golden Honeycomb (1977), and Pleasure City (1982). Her last novel, Bombay Tiger, was published posthumously (2008) by her daughter Kim Oliver.

Death
Kamala Markandaya died aged 79 on 16 May 2004.

Works
 Nectar in a Sieve, London: Putnam, New York: John Day, 1954
 Some Inner Fury, London: Putnam, 1955, New York: John Day, 1956
 A Silence of Desire, London: Putnam, New York: John Day, 1960
 Possession; a novel, London: Putnam, New York: John Day, 1963
 A Handful of Rice, London: Hamish Hamilton, New York: John Day, 1966
 The Coffer Dams, London: Hamilton, New York: John Day, 1969
 The Nowhere Man, New York: John Day, 1972, London: Allen Lane, 1973
 Two Virgins, New York: John Day, 1973, London: Chatto & Windus, 1974
 The Golden Honeycomb, London: Chatto & Windus, New York: Crowell, 1977
 Pleasure City, London: Chatto & Windus, 1982. Published in the United States under the title Shalimar, New York: Harper & Row, 1982
 Bombay Tiger, New Delhi: Penguin, 2008 (Posthumously published)

Literary criticism
 Almeida, Rochelle. Originality and Imitation: Indianness in the Novels of Kamala Markandaya. Jaipur: Rawat Publications, 2000.
 Aror, Sudhir K. Multicultural Consciousness in the Novels of Kamala Markandaya. Authors press, 2011.
 Jha, Rekha. The Novels of Kamala Markandaya and Ruth Prawer Jhabvala: A Study in East-West Encounter. New Delhi: Prestige Books, 1990.
 Joseph, Margaret P.  Kamala Markandaya, Indian Writers Series, N. Delhi: Arnold-Heinemann, 1980.
 Krishna Rao, A. V. The Indo-Anglian Novel and Changing Tradition: A Study of the Novels of Mulk Raj Anad, Kamala Markandaya, R.K. Narayan, Raja Rao, 1930–64.  Mysore: 1972.
 Parameswaran, Uma. Kamala Markandaya. Jaipur: Rawat Publications, 2000.
 Shrivastava, Manish. "Conflicts of Sensibility in Kamala Markandaya's A Silence of Desire". Synthesis: Indian Journal of English Literature and Language. vol.1, no.1.
 Singh, Indu. "The Feminist Approach in Kamala Markandaya's Novels with Special Reference to Nectar in a Sieve", Synthesis: Indian Journal of English Literature and Language, vol. 1, no. 1.

See also 
 Indian writing in English

References

External links 
 Kamala Markandaya biography
 Francis C. Assisi, "A Pioneer Who Influenced All Of Us...", Outlook, 25 May 2004.
 

1924 births
2004 deaths
Journalists from Karnataka
Writers from Mysore
Women writers from Karnataka
British people of Indian descent
English-language writers from India
Indian women journalists
20th-century Indian women writers
21st-century Indian novelists
20th-century Indian journalists
Novelists from Karnataka
21st-century Indian women writers